Markos Drakos (1888–1975) was a member of the Drakos family and a Lieutenant General of the Hellenic Army most notable for his leadership during the Greco-Italian War of 1940–41, as commander of the Eastern Macedonia Army Section and of the Epirus Army Section.

1888 births
1975 deaths
Hellenic Army generals of World War II
Greek military personnel of the Greco-Turkish War (1919–1922)
Military personnel from Athens